Skhirtladze is a Georgian surname. It may refer to
Boleslav Skhirtladze (born 1987), Georgian long jumper
Davit Skhirtladze (born 1993), Georgian football player
Georgi Skhirtladze (1932–2008), Georgian wrestler
Khatuna Skhirtladze (born 1990), Georgian beauty pageant contestant
Natia Skhirtladze (born 1990), Georgian football defender